A drawing room play is a type of play, developed during the Victorian period in the United Kingdom, in which the actions take place in a drawing room or which is designed to be reenacted in the drawing room of a home. The common practice of entertaining a guest in the home led to the creation of this category of plays and while the drawing room itself has fallen out of favour, the play format has continued to provide a source of entertainment. 

While there is no date or authority directly ascribed to the term drawing room play, there is evidence that the term was derived from the English habit of putting on these short works for guests while entertaining in the drawing room of the home. In French usage the room and the social gathering it contained are equally the salon.

Types
Beginning with the early forms of drama, the drawing room play has evolved to encompass comedy as well as to include the forms of the dramatic monologue. The play format itself has also grown out of the traditional drawing room performance and back into main street theatre and film. Drawing room comedy is also sometimes called the "comedy of manners." Many of the drawing room plays adapted some form of social criticism in the transition from the Victorian period into the Modern era.The genre is comedy

Examples
 The Elder Statesman (1959) was the last of T. S. Eliot's drawing room works.
 Oscar Wilde's The Importance of Being Earnest is one of the most widely known examples of the drawing room play.
 Several of the collected works of Noël Coward are also considered typical of the form.
 Paul Rudnick's Regrets Only is a contemporary drawing room comedy released in 2006.
 Additional authors include Clement Scott, Walter Besant, Grace Luce Irwin and Arnold Bennett.

See also 
 Chamber play

Sources
Nicholas Cooper, Houses of the Gentry 1480-1680 (English Heritage) 1999: "Parlours and withdrawing rooms 289-93.

Stage terminology
Victorian culture